David Woobay (born in Taimede Chiefdom, Moyamba, Moyamba District) is a Sierra Leonean politician and a member of the Sierra Leone People's Party (SLPP). He is a retired civil servant who served as the Director of Sports. He later on retirement became the first elected Moyamba District Council Chairman in 2004. He was re-elected to the same office in 2008 with 84% approval rating. David Woobay is a member of the Mende ethnic group. A foundation in his name was established to promote girl-child education in Moyamba District.

External links
Africell Sierra Leone launches in Moyamba

Mayors of places in Sierra Leone
Sierra Leone People's Party politicians
Living people
Mende people
People from Moyamba District
Year of birth missing (living people)